Elmer Peter Kohler (November 6, 1865 - May 24, 1938) was an American organic chemist who spent his career on the faculty at Bryn Mawr College and later at Harvard University. At both institutions he was notable for his effectiveness in teaching.

Early life and education
Kohler was born in Egypt, Pennsylvania to a family of Pennsylvania Dutch heritage. He attended Muhlenberg College and graduated in 1868, but took only one chemistry course while there. After graduating, he took a job as a passenger agent with the Santa Fe Railroad. Eventually he returned to his education and received a master's degree from Muhlenberg in 1889 before beginning at Johns Hopkins as a student of Ira Remsen. He received his Ph.D. in 1892.

Academic career
After completing his Ph.D. Kohler was appointed as an instructor at Bryn Mawr College. He became a professor there in 1900 and later became head of the chemistry department. In 1912 he moved to Harvard University, becoming the Abbott and James Lawrence Professor two years later and the Sheldon Emery Professor in 1934. At both institutions he was recognized as an excellent teacher and lecturer. He notably avoided other public speaking events such as scientific meetings and talks, which those who knew him attributed to shyness. Throughout his career Kohler was noted as a skilled experimentalist, continuing to work in the laboratory himself till very shortly before his death. He was particularly noted for skill in fractional crystallization and for investigations of the synthesis and properties of various unsaturated compounds of interest. Among his earliest graduate students at Harvard was James B. Conant, who later became president of the university.

Kohler was elected to the United States National Academy of Sciences in 1920 and the German National Academy of Sciences Leopoldina in 1926.

References

American chemists
Organic chemists
Bryn Mawr College faculty
Harvard University faculty
1865 births
1938 deaths
Members of the United States National Academy of Sciences
Members of the German Academy of Sciences Leopoldina